Sin Chow-Yiu is the Hon-Yin and Suet-Fong Chan Professor in Chinese and the Head of Department of Chinese at the University of Hong Kong. He is also the Chief Editor of the Journal of Oriental Studies.

References

Academic staff of the University of Hong Kong
Alumni of King's College, Hong Kong
Year of birth missing (living people)
Living people